The Medal of St. Hallvard is the highest award of the City of Oslo, Norway. It is awarded to people who have made a particularly noteworthy contribution to the City of Oslo.  It is named after the city's patron, Saint Hallvard (ca. 1020–1043). The medal was designed by goldsmith Jacob Prytz (1886–1962) of the jewelry firm J. Tostrup in Oslo. It has been awarded since 1956.

Recipients
The following people have received the medal:

1956 Arnstein Arneberg, Randolf Arnesen, Arno Berg, Gerhard Fischer, Rachel Grepp, Paul Hartmann, Hieronymus Heyerdahl, Sverre Iversen, Per Kviberg, Arthur Nordlie, Magnus Poulsson, Anna Sethne, H. E. Stokke, Sigrid Syvertsen
1957 Rolf Gjessing, Harald Hals, Almar Lund, Haavard Martinsen, Carl Muller
1958 Ulrik Hendriksen, Rolf Hofmo, Yngvar Kjelstrup, Johan Lofthus, Marius Røhne, Ragnhild Schibbye, Martin Strandli
1959 Harry Fett
1960 Trygve Nilsen, Rolf Stranger
1961 no award
1962 Carl Just, Halfdan Wigaard
1963 no award
1964 Aasny Stoltenberg, Gunvor Vogt
1965 Carl Semb
1966 Laura Nadheim, Karen Kapmann Bothner
1967 Eyvind Alnæs, Katy Due, Andreas Grasmo, Alfhild Hovdan, Eugen Johannessen, Henny Ording
1968–69 no award
1970 Einar Gerhardsen, Chr. L. Jensen, Arild Sandvold, Egil Storstein, Arnfinn Vik
1971 Egil Werner Erichsen, John Johansen, Hjalmar Larsen, Alf Rolfsen, Signy Stamnes
1972–73 no award
1974 Chris Bruusgaard, Georg Eriksen, Gerda Evang, Harald Frøshaug, Omar Gjesteby, Erling Hagen, Nils Houge, Lars Ljøgodt, Gunnar Nielsen
1975 Gunnar Bech, Øystein Egelund, Brita Collett Paus, Hans Sundrønning
1976 Brynjulf Bull, Ole Bjune, Eva Kolstad, Jakob Vaage
1977 Viktor Gaustad, Lille Graah, Rolf Stenersen, Knut Tvedt
1978 Vera Fjeldstad, Tor Albert Henni, Jon Kojen, Hallvard Vislie, Fredrik Chr. Wildhagen
1979 no award
1980 Jenny Haugen, Petter Koren, Birgit Sunnaas
1981 Anne Nilsen, Arne Sandbu, Christian Bruusgaard, Odd Kjus
1982 Einar Bergsland, Rolf Karlsen, Hjørdis Lundh
1983 Else Marit Larsen, Ragnar Falck Anderssen, Bergljot Gudim, Svein Fakset, Ragnhild Eriksen, Boris Hansen
1984–85 no award
1986 Olav Selvaag, Erik Sture Larre, Gøsta Åbergh, Sofie Helene Wigert, Mariss Jansons, Fredrik Mellbye
1987 no award
1988 Bjørn Bjørnseth, Merle Sivertsen, Ivar Mathisen, Odd Wivegh, Nanna Lynneberg, Willy Enersen, Odd Wien, Odd Gjesteby
1989 Grete Waitz, Kaare Kopperud, Mentz Schulerud, Petter Ludvigsen
1990 no award
1991 Erik Melvold, Nico Demetriades, Torstein Grythe, Wenche Foss, Rønnaug Johansen
1992 no award
1993 Mosse Jørgensen, Albert Nordengen, Trygve Flagstad
1994 no award
1995 Henriette Bie Lorentzen, Thorleif Kleive, Frode Rinnan, Jan Hemsvik
1996 Per Aabel
1997 Thor Heyerdahl
1998 no award
1999 Bernt H. Lund
2000 Rolf Nyhus, Njål Djurhuus og Erna Djurhuus, Hans Svelland
2001 no award
2002 Aud Schønemann, Rigmor Andresen
2003–2005: no award
2006 Gunnar Stålsett
2007 Tor Holtan-Hartwig, Kjetil André Aamodt
2008 Hjalmar Kielland
2009 Gunnar Sønsteby
2010 Børre Rognlien
2011 Kari Svendsen
2012 Ingen utdeling
2013 Per Ditlev-Simonsen, Tor Sannerød, Inger Seim, Ann-Marit Sæbønes
2014 Thomas Thiis-Evensen
2015 Christian Ringnes, Jorun Valeur Bekkby og Fakhra Salimi
2016 Erling Lae, Martin Mæland
2017 Marianne Lind, Lillebjørn Nilsen
2018 Lars Saabye Christensen
2019 Sissel Rønbeck, Ida Fossum Tønnessen

References

Civil awards and decorations of Norway
Municipal awards
Culture in Oslo
Awards established in 1956
1956 establishments in Norway